New Zealand Republican Party may refer to:

New Zealand Republican Party (1967), political party founded in 1967, dissolved in 1974
New Zealand Republican Party (1995), political party founded in 1995, dissolved in 2002

See also
The Republic of New Zealand Party, political party founded in 2005, dissolved in 2009